Martin Emmrich and Andreas Siljeström were the defending champions but decided not to participate.
Robert Kendrick and Donald Young won this event, by defeating 4th seeds Ryler DeHeart and Pierre-Ludovic Duclos 7–6(5), 7–6(3) in the final.

Seeds

Draw

Draw

External links
 Doubles Draw
 Qualifying Doubles Draw

Virginia National Bank Men's Pro Championship - Doubles
2010 Doubles